Borderless Magazine is a Chicago-based online magazine that reports on immigration, labor, justice, and advocacy issues throughout the Midwestern United States. Borderless is a non-profit, independent media organization, and is a member of the Institute for Nonprofit News.  Articles are often published in multiple languages, including versions in Spanish, Arabic, Mandarin Chinese, Tagalog, and other languages.

Borderless started in 2017 as the "90 Days, 90 Voices" project by Sarah Conway, Alex Hernandez and Nissa Rhee, with a focus on local immigrant communities. 90 Days, 90 Voices incorporated as a nonprofit organization in 2018. In October 2019, the name of the organization changed to Borderless Magazine.

External links

References

American news websites
Magazines published in Chicago
Magazines established in 2017
News magazines published in the United States
Online magazines published in the United States